Jacobus Bukes (12 March 1896 – 11 December 1953) was a South African sprinter. He competed in the men's 100 metres at the 1920 Summer Olympics.

References

1896 births
1953 deaths
Athletes (track and field) at the 1920 Summer Olympics
South African male sprinters
Olympic athletes of South Africa
People from Kroonstad
Orange Free State people